50th Birthday Celebration Volume 11 is a triple live album by the Bar Kokhba Sextet documenting their performance at Tonic in September 2003 as part of John Zorn's month-long 50th Birthday Celebration.

Reception
The Allmusic review awarded the album 3.5 stars.

Track listing

Personnel
Cyro Baptista – percussion 
Joey Baron – drums 
Greg Cohen – bass 
Erik Friedlander – cello 
Marc Ribot – guitar 
Mark Feldman – violin 
John Zorn – conductor

References

Albums produced by John Zorn
Bar Kokhba albums
John Zorn live albums
2005 live albums
Tzadik Records live albums